The Calella Lighthouse is an active lighthouse situated in the coastal town of Calella in Costa del Maresme, 58 km northeast of Barcelona, in Catalonia, Spain.

Its construction began on 9 October 1856, and the engineer responsible for the project was Marià Parellada. The lighthouse was inaugurated on 15 December 1859.

See also 

 List of lighthouses in Spain

References 

https://www.costadebarcelonamaresme.cat/en/culture/museums/calella-lighthouse-interpretation-center

External links 
 Comisión de faros
 Autoridat Portuària de Barcelona

Lighthouses in Spain